Edmond Yunanpour is a retired Iranian football player and manager.

Managerial career
Through his career, Yunanpour has managed several teams, including PAS Tehran, Keshavarzi, Saba Battery, Bargh, 
Rah Ahan, and Aboomoslem. At the start of the 2009–10 Azadegan League season, he was appointed the head coach of Damash Lorestan. However, after a disappointing start, he was fired and replaced with Markar Aghajanyan. Later in the year, he took over for Mahmoud Fekri, who resigned from his post as coach of Shirin Faraz. After the Death of Foolad Yazd F.C.'s Manager Mohsen Aghazadeh, he took over in 2011.

References

Living people
Iranian footballers
Iranian football managers
1963 births
Association footballers not categorized by position
People from Ahvaz
Sportspeople from Khuzestan province